Carabus planicollis planicollis is a subspecies of ground beetle from Carabinae subfamily that is endemic to Romania.

References

planicollis planicollis
Beetles described in 1827
Endemic fauna of Romania